1997 Iran earthquake may refer to: 
1997 Bojnurd earthquake
1997 Ardabil earthquake
1997 Qayen earthquake